Union councils of Jhenaidah District are the smallest rural administrative and local government units in Jhenaidah District of Bangladesh. The district consists of 6 municipalities, 6 upazilas, 5 thana, 55 ward, 136 mahalla, 67 union porishods, mouza 945 and 1144 villages.

Harinakunda Upazila
Harinakunda Upazila is divided into Harinakunda Municipality and eight union parishads. The union parishads are subdivided into 77 mauzas and 122 villages. Harinakunda Municipality is subdivided into 9 wards and 17 mahallas.
 Bhayna Union
 Chandpur Union
 Daulatpur Union
 Falsi Union
 Joradah Union
 Kapashatia Union
 Raghunathpur Union
 Taherhuda Union

Jhenaidah Sadar Upazila
Jhenaidah Sadar Upazila is divided into Jhenaidah Municipality and 17 union parishads. The union parishads are subdivided into 268 mauzas and 284 villages. Jhenaidah Municipality is subdivided into 9 wards and 34 mahallas.
 Dogachi Union
 Fursondi Union
 Ganna Union
 Ghorshal Union
 Halidhani Union
 Harishongkorpur Union 
 Kalicharanpur Union
 Kumrabaria Union
 Maharazpur Union
 Modhuhati Union
 Naldanga Union
 Padmakar Union
 Paglakanai Union
 Porahati Union
 Sadhuhati Union
 Saganna Union
 Surat Union

Kaliganj Upazila
Kaliganj Upazila is divided into Kaliganj Municipality and 11 union parishads. The union parishads are subdivided into 188 mauzas and 198 villages. Kaliganj Municipality is subdivided into 9 wards and 20 mahallas.
 Baro Bazar Union
 Jamal Union 
 Kashtabhanga Union
 Kola Union
 Maliat Union
 Niamatpur Union
 Raygram Union
 Rakhalgachi Union
 Shimla-Rokonpur Union
 Sundarpur-Durgapur Union
 Trilochanpur Union

Kotchandpur Upazila
Kotchandpur Upazila is divided into Kotchandpur Municipality and five union parishads. The union parishads are subdivided into 81 mauzas and 79 villages. Kotchandpur Municipality is subdivided into 9 wards and 25 mahallas.
 Baluhar Union
 Dora Union
 Elangi Union
 Kushna Union
 Sabdalpur Union

Maheshpur Upazila
Maheshpur Upazila is divided into Maheshpur Municipality and 12 union parishads. The union parishads are subdivided into 150 mauzas and 196 villages. Maheshpur Municipality is subdivided into 9 wards and 16 mahallas.
 Azampur Union
 Banshbaria Union
 Fatepur Union
 Jadabpur Union
 Kazirber Union
 Mandarbaria Union
 Natima Union
 Nepa Union
 S.B.K Union
 Panthapara Union
 Shyamkur Union
 Swaruppur Union

Shailkupa Upazila
Shailkupa Upazila is divided into Shailkupa Municipality and 14 union parishads. The union parishads are subdivided into 181 mauzas and 264 villages. Shailkupa Municipality is subdivided into 9 wards and 24 mahallas.
 Abaipur Union
 Bogura Union
 Dignagore Union
 Dhaloharachandra Union
 Dudshar Union
 Fulhari Union
 Hakimpur Union
 Kancherkol Union
 Manoharpur Union
 Mirzapur Union
 Nityanandapur Union
 Sarutia Union
 Tribeni Union
 Umedpur Union

References 

Local government in Bangladesh